The first Schüssel government of Austria was formed after the 1999 Austrian legislative election under Chancellor Wolfgang Schüssel. It was replaced shortly after the 2002 election.

Composition

Notes and references 

 

Austrian governments
2000s in Austria
2000 establishments in Austria
2003 disestablishments in Austria